Pseudagrion lucifer is a species of damselfly in the family Coenagrionidae,
commonly known as a citrine-headed riverdamsel. 
It is found in northern Australia, where it inhabits streams.

Pseudagrion lucifer is a medium-sized damselfly. Males of the species have yellow faces and pruinose sides to their bodies and start of their tails; males from Cape York in Queensland have cream-yellow faces, whilst those from the Kimberley region in Western Australia have bright yellow faces.

Pseudagrion lucifer appears similar to Pseudagrion ignifer which is found in eastern Australia.

Gallery

See also
 List of Odonata species of Australia

References 

Coenagrionidae
Odonata of Australia
Insects of Australia
Taxa named by Günther Theischinger
Insects described in 1997
Damselflies